The All India Tennis Association (AITA), is the governing body of tennis in India. It was established in 1920 and affiliated by International Tennis Federation and Asian Tennis Federation.

All India Tennis Association operates all of the Indian national representative tennis sides, including the India Davis Cup team, the India Fed Cup team and youth sides as well. AITA is also responsible for organising and hosting tennis tournaments within India and scheduling the home international fixtures.

History 
Tennis was introduced in India in the 1880s by British Army and Civilian Officers. Soon after, regular tournaments like the 'Punjab Lawn tennis Championship' at Lahore (Now in Pakistan) (1885); 'Bengal Lawn Tennis Championship' at Calcutta (1887) and the All India Tennis Championships at Allahabad in (1910) were organised. Initially the British like TD Berrington and LC Ogbourne won these championships, however slowly Indians started picking up the game. Mohd Saleem of Lahore won the Punjab Championship in 1915 and thereafter consecutively from 1919 to 1926. In 1917 NS Iyer lifted the Bengal Championship. In 1919 Mr. Nagu picked up the prestigious singles crown at the All India Tennis Championship at City's Gymkhana Club at Allahabad. Henceforth the Indians started playing the game with greater distinction.

In March 1920, the All India Lawn Tennis Association was formed at Lahore. At this meeting the constitution and by laws were framed on the lines of the constitution of Lawn Tennis Association of Britain. In November 1920, the first AGM of AILTA was held at the Town Hall at Delhi. Samuel Perry O'Donnell, a British member of the Indian Civil Service (ICS) was elected as the first president. In this meeting, it was decided to hold the annual 'All India National Championships' at Allahabad and to participate in Davis Cup competition. In its debut, Indian team consisting of SM Jacob, Mohd Saleem, LS Deane and AA Fayzee upset a stronger French team to reach the semi finals. With AITA at the helm of affairs, different Provinces formed Provincial Associations (now known as State Associations and were affiliated to parent organisation. An Inter Provincial Tournament was organised with effect from 1922. Punjab LTA led by Mohd. Saleem became the first champions. This yearly competition continued till the eve of the Second World War (1939).

Around the early 1980s the name of the association was changed to the 'All India Tennis Association'. From the beginning of the 1990s tennis in India has started getting a new look. The financial position of the association has improved considerably. The association constructed a full-fledged modern National Stadium at Delhi with a seating capacity of 5000 spectators in 1996.

Headquarters
The AITA organisation has its headquarters in Delhi's R.K. Khanna Tennis Complex. Until 1996, the organisation was functioning from temporary places like Calcutta now Kolkata, Delhi and Madras.

London Olympics
On 15 June 2012, the All India Tennis Association on Friday chose Leander Paes and Mahesh Bhupathi for the men's doubles event of the London Olympics. However Mahesh Bhupathi showed his reluctance to play alongside Paes.
AITA has decided to send two teams for Olympics, Mahesh Bhupathi and Rohan Bopanna as one team and the other team consisting of Leander Paes and Vishnu Vardhan.

Format of tournaments
AITA conducts the following types of tournaments:

Talent Series
Championship Series
Super Series
National Series
Two Nationals - Hard Court and Clay

Former tournaments
Listed below are tournaments that were part of the world wide tour at some point.

National
 All India Covered Court Championships
 All India Hard Court Championships
 All India Lawn Tennis Championships
 India International Championships
 India National and Northern India Championships
 India Professional Championships
 National Lawn Tennis Championships of India

Regional
 Central India Championships
 East India and All Assam Hardcourts
 East India Championships
 Northern India Championships
 North West India Championships
 Southern India Championships
 South West India Championships
 Upper India Championships
 Western India Championships

State
 Andhra Pradesh State Championships
 Bengal Championships
 Hyderabad State Championships
 Kerala State Championships
 Madhya Pradesh State Championships
 Madras State Championships
 Mysore State Championships
 Punjab Lawn Tennis Championships
 Punjab State Championships
 Rajasthan Championships
 Uttar Pradesh Championships

References

External links 
All India Tennis Association website

Tennis in India
Organisations based in Delhi
T
India
Sports organizations established in 1920
1920 establishments in British India